Moldflow is a producer of simulation software for high-end plastic injection molding computer-aided engineering. It is owned by Autodesk.

Autodesk stable release is Moldflow 2023.

Moldflow was founded in Melbourne, Australia as Moldflow Pty. Ltd. in 1978 by Colin Austin. In 2008 Moldflow was acquired by Autodesk for $297M.

Products 

Moldflow has two core products: Moldflow Adviser which provides manufacturability guidance and directional feedback for standard part and mold design, and Moldflow Insight which provides definitive results for flow, cooling, and warpage along with support for specialized molding processes.  In addition, Autodesk produces Moldflow Design, Moldflow CAD Doctor, Moldflow synergy, Moldflow Magics STL Expert, and Moldflow Structural Alliance that serve as connectivity tools for other CAD and CAE software.  They also have a free results viewer, Moldflow Communicator.

References

External links 
 Official Autodesk Wiki Help
 Official Moldflow page on Autodesk website
 Official Moldflow website
 Corporate history (up to 2004) at answers.com

Software companies of Australia
Autodesk acquisitions